Harry V. Roberts (1923–2004), American statistician, was a distinguished teacher and a pioneer in looking at the applications of Bayesian statistics to business decision making and in Total Quality Management.

Roberts began teaching at the University of Chicago Graduate School of Business in 1949 as an instructor of statistics. He was promoted to assistant professor in 1951. He earned his Ph.D. from the University of Chicago in 1955, and was appointed associate professor. He was made full professor in 1959, and was named Sigmund E. Edelstone Professor of Statistics and Quality Management in 1991. In 1997, Roberts was awarded the Norman Maclean Faculty Award from the University of Chicago for his contributions to teaching and to the student experience on campus.  In recognition of his career achievements, the Chicago chapter of the American Statistical Association created the Harry V. Roberts Statistical Advocate Award, first given in January 2002.

His varied research interests also included interactive computing; time series analysis; the relation between statistical theory and practical decision making; survey methodology and practice; and productivity and quality improvement.

Roberts was the co-author of many influential publications, including two groundbreaking books: Basic Methods of Marketing Research (with James Lorie) and the textbook, Statistics: A New Approach (with W. Allen Wallis). He also co-authored an early work on the random walk hypothesis of stock market prices, “Differencing of Random Walks and Near Random Walks,” with Nicholas Gonedes, published in the Journal of Econometrics in 1977.

Roberts was an early computer enthusiast, and was especially interested in developing computer methods for statistical analysis. In the late 1960s, Roberts, in collaboration with his wife June and Robert Ling, developed a statistics package called Interactive Data Analysis (IDA), used for statistical instruction at a number of top business schools.

Toward the end of his career, Roberts helped develop a curriculum in Total Quality Management at Chicago GSB and co-authored Quality is Personal: A Foundation for Total Quality Management (with B. F. Sergesketter).  This was a novel application of TQM methods to self-improvement, reminiscent of self-experimentation.

External links
  Univ. of Chicago Obituary
 Chicago Chapter of Amer. Statistical Association

1923 births
2004 deaths
University of Chicago alumni
American statisticians
Fellows of the American Statistical Association